RMS Nova Scotia was a  UK transatlantic ocean liner and Royal Mail Ship. In World War II she was requisitioned as a troopship. In 1942 a German submarine sank her in the Indian Ocean with the loss of 858 of the 1,052 people aboard.

Building

Vickers, Sons & Maxim, Ltd of Barrow-in-Furness built Nova Scotia for Furness, Withy & Co of Liverpool. She was the sister ship of RMS , which Vickers had launched for the same owner 11 months previously.

Her boat deck had six lifeboats, mounted on Welin-Maclachlan davits.

Civilian service
Nova Scotia joined Newfoundland on Furness, Withy's regular transatlantic mail route between Liverpool and Boston via St John's, Newfoundland and Halifax, Nova Scotia. Passengers included Roald Dahl, then aged 17, who in August 1934 was one of 50 public school boys who sailed from Liverpool on an expedition to Newfoundland of the recently founded Public Schools Exploring Society. Their passage to St John's took a week.

After the UK entered World War II in September 1939, the ship at first remained in civilian service. On 21 September 1940 she sailed from Liverpool bound for Canada, carrying passengers including the final 29 children to leave Britain under the Children's Overseas Reception Board (CORB) evacuation scheme. The CORB scheme was then discontinued because of the great loss of life when  sank Ellerman Lines'  on 17 September.

Troop ship

Early in 1941 the Ministry of War Transport requisitioned Nova Scotia as a troop ship, and on 3 February she embarked 1,200 troops. She joined a convoy from Britain to Freetown, Sierra Leone, where she arrived on 2 March. Nova Scotia continued south, crossing the Equator on 12 March and reaching Cape Town, South Africa, on 22 March.

In the autumn of 1942 Nova Scotia left Port Tewfik in Egypt and sailed down the Red Sea to Massawa in British-occupied Eritrea, where she put US troops ashore and embarked Italian prisoners of war. She also called at the British Colony of Aden and then proceeded southwards unescorted, carrying over 750 Italian prisoners of war and civilian internees and 3,000 bags of mail bound for Durban, South Africa.

Nova Scotia had passed through the Mozambique Channel and was off the coast of Natal Province, South Africa, when at 7:15 on the morning of 28 November the  hit her with three torpedoes. Nova Scotia rolled to port, caught fire and sank by the bow within 10 minutes. The crew managed to launch only one lifeboat; other survivors depended on life rafts or pieces of wreckage. Those who were left in the water either drowned or were killed by sharks.

In order to identify which ship it had just sunk, U-177 recovered two survivors. They were interned Italian merchant sailors who explained that most of those aboard had been Italian internees. Because of the Laconia Order that Admiral Dönitz had issued two months previously, the submarine's commander, Robert Gysae, withdrew U-177 from the area and radioed the Befehlshaber der U-Boote (BdU) for orders. The BdU ordered him to leave survivors in the water and continue on patrol. The BdU requested help from Portugal, which sent the frigate  from Lourenço Marques in neighbouring Mozambique.

Afonso de Albuquerque reached the area on 29 November. Five survivors fired a distress flare and were rescued by the frigate. The next day Afonso de Albuquerque found herself surrounded by hundreds of floating corpses. The frigate rescued 130 Italian internees, 42 guards, 17 crew members, three military and naval personnel, one DEMS gunner and one passenger. 858 people died: 650 Italian internees, 96 crew members, 88 South African guards, 10 DEMS gunners, eight military and naval personnel, five passengers, and Nova Scotias master.

Two further survivors reached safety. One was rescued on the third day after the attack; the other was an Italian who drifted on a liferaft for a fortnight until he came ashore at Mtunzini in Natal.

Monuments
Many corpses were washed ashore in Natal. The bodies of 120 Italian prisoners of war and internees were buried in a mass grave in the Hillary suburb of Durban, forming the nucleus of what became the Italian Military Cemetery there. In 1982 a substantial monument was erected on the grave.

In 2008, the bodies were moved to the Pietermaritzburg Italian P.O.W. Church cemetery.

Nova Scotias Italian dead are commemorated also in a monument at the Italian church at Adi Quala, Eritrea.

See also
  — torpedoed in July 1940 while carrying interned Italian civilians
  — torpedoed in December 1941 while carrying Italian prisoners of war

References

Sources and further reading

External links
  – interview with survivor Thomas Goodyear
 
 
  — includes German photographs of the sinking of the ship and Portuguese photos of the rescue of survivors

 

1926 ships
Ships built in Barrow-in-Furness
Maritime incidents in November 1942
Passenger ships of the United Kingdom
Ships sunk by German submarines in World War II
Shipwrecks of the South African Indian Ocean coast
Shark attacks
Steamships of the United Kingdom
Troop ships of the United Kingdom